Karl Sigurd Andersson (18 July 1926 – 5 February 2009) was a Swedish cross-country skier who won a bronze medal in the 4 × 10 km relay at the 1952 Winter Olympics in Oslo.

Andersson was lumberjack by profession. He won his first skiing medal in 1946, at the junior district championships. In 1950 he finished third in the 15 km race at the national senior championships and was included into the national team. He won his only national title in 1952, in the relay.

Cross-country skiing results

Olympic Games
 1 medal – (1 bronze)

References

1926 births
2009 deaths
People from Kalix Municipality
Cross-country skiers from Norrbotten County
Olympic cross-country skiers of Sweden
Swedish male cross-country skiers
Cross-country skiers at the 1952 Winter Olympics
Olympic medalists in cross-country skiing
Medalists at the 1952 Winter Olympics
Olympic bronze medalists for Sweden